Calosoma investigator is a species of ground beetle belonging to the genus Calosoma and the subgenus Charmosta. The species is diffused in North-Eastern Europe and Siberia.

References

External links

Calosoma investigator on zin.ru

investigator
Beetles described in 1798
Beetles of Europe